The 2004 Copa del Rey Final was the 102nd final of the Spanish cup competition, the Copa del Rey. The final was played at Montjuïc in Barcelona, on 17 March 2004.

The match was won by Zaragoza, who defeated Real Madrid 3–2 after extra time, winning the tournament for the sixth time in club history.

Match details

References

External links
Linguasport

2004
1
Real Madrid CF matches
Real Zaragoza matches